The Ministry of Soil and Water Conservation is a Ministry of the Government of Maharashtra. 
state.

The Ministry is headed by a cabinet level Minister. Eknath Shinde is Current Chief Minister of Maharashtra and Minister of Soil and Water Conservation Government of Maharashtra.

Head office

List of Cabinet Ministers

List of Ministers of State

References

Government ministries of Maharashtra